Körfez SK, formerly Kocaeli Birlik Spor, is a Turkish sports club from Körfez, Kocaeli Province. After five years playing non-league football, the club gained a place back in the Third League for the 2007–08 season. That year they gained another promotion. From the 2008–09 season, the team has competed in the TFF Second League 1st group.

In 2010, the club was renamed from Körfez Belediyespor to Körfez SK.

External links 
Official website
Körfez on TFF.org

Football clubs in Turkey
Kocaeli Province